O Independente (Portuguese for The Independent) was a Portuguese weekly newspaper published in Lisbon, Portugal, between 1988 and 2006.

History and profile
O Independente was first published in May 1988 by Miguel Esteves Cardoso, who became its first editor, and Paulo Portas, who succeeded him in 1990 and served until 1995 when he left to run for office as a conservative politician.

O Independente was published by Recoletos weekly on Fridays. Its headquarters was in Lisbon. The paper had a rightwing, conservative stance and a Eurosceptic discourse.

The last edition of O Independente was published on 1 September 2006.

References

1988 establishments in Portugal
2006 disestablishments in Portugal
Conservatism in Portugal
Defunct newspapers published in Portugal
Defunct weekly newspapers
Newspapers established in 1988
Newspapers published in Lisbon
Portuguese-language newspapers
Publications disestablished in 2006
Weekly newspapers published in Portugal